SuperStar România is the Romanian adaptation of the Idols franchise and premieres on September 10, 2021. Originally announced at the beginning of 2021, the show is scheduled to start airing this Fall on Pro TV. Thus, replacing Vocea României, which was usually the Fall–Winter music show on the television schedule. The jurors of the show will be: pop-rock anonymous artist Carla's Dreams, pop-R&B composer and producer Marius Moga, dance-house singer Raluka, and pop singer-songwriter and producer Smiley.

The aim of the show is to discover the new music superstar in Romania aged between 16 and 30 years.

Selection process
The aspiring superstars were able to register online on the show's website. Country-wide pre-selections started March 26 in Brașov and ended April 18 in Bucharest.

Bootchamp

Semi-finals

Live shows

Results summary

Live shows details

Live show 1 : Top 10

Live show 2 : Top 8

References

Romanian television series
2021 Romanian television series debuts
Pro TV original programming